Luftflotte Reich (Air Fleet Reich) was one of the primary divisions of the German Luftwaffe in World War II.  It was formed on February 5, 1944 in Berlin-Wannsee from Luftwaffenbefehlshaber Mitte. Its primary task was to defend German air space during the Defense of the Reich campaign.

It was among the only Luftwaffe division that was in possession of a sizable number of Me 262s and Me 163s fielding over 140 rocket aircraft as late as February 1945.

Commanding officers
 Generaloberst Hans-Jürgen Stumpff, 5 February 1944 – 8 May 1945

Chief of staff
 Generalmajor Sigismund Freiherr von Falkenstein, 5 February – 12 May 1944
 Generalmajor Andreas Nielsen, 12 May 1944 – 8 May 1945

References

Citations

Bibliography
 

German Air Fleets in World War II
Military units and formations established in 1944
Military units and formations disestablished in 1945